Francisco Hernández Illana (c. 1700 in Valencia? – 1780 in Burgos) was a Spanish composer. He was maestro de capilla of El Patriarca in 1728, and published a set of Cantadas al Santísimo.

References

1700s births
1780 deaths
Spanish Baroque composers
18th-century classical composers
18th-century male musicians
Spanish male classical composers